The women's hammer throw event at the 2015 European Athletics U23 Championships was held in Tallinn, Estonia, at Kadriorg Stadium on 10 and 11 July.

Medalists

Results

Final
11 July

Qualifications
10 July

Participation
According to an unofficial count, 26 athletes from 19 countries participated in the event.

References

Hammer throw
Hammer throw at the European Athletics U23 Championships